"Rosier" is the third single by Japanese rock band Luna Sea, released on July 21, 1994. It reached number 3 on the Oricon Singles Chart, and charted for 25 weeks. In 1998, it was certified Platinum by the RIAJ for sales over 400,000.

Composition
Guitarist Sugizo cited "Rosier" as one of the songs wherein he tried to replicate the "psychedelic feel of shoegaze bands" by using effects, "like playing fast with a wah-wah pedal, or using tape-echo and harmonizers. I couldn’t figure out how they did it, so I just made it into my own thing."

The fast spoken English words in the middle of the song were written and performed by J. As a staple of Luna Sea concerts, J throws his mic stand over his head and behind his back after finishing his vocal part.

This single version of "Rosier" is slightly different from the one on the album, Mother. An 8 cm CD of a live version of the song was given away to winners of a magazine contest. Live versions also appear on the band's Never Sold Out and Never Sold Out 2 albums.

Music video
The music video for "Rosier" opens with the camera spiraling down on to a coffin, similar to the single's cover art, with roses on it covering the glass window at its head. The majority shows the band performing the song against a white backdrop with smoke flowing along the ground. Black and white and light blue filters were also used, as was slow motion. A dominant feature is the camera work; a crane takes the viewer over the band 180 degrees from the front of its members, ending upside down at their backs, the opposite is also seen. 360 degree shots around the band are also shown.

Close-ups of the band members against a dark backdrop, separated from the camera by fluorescent lights, which provide the shots' only light, are inter-cut. During J's vocal part, the English lyrics appear flashing over the video in a typed font. Instead of ending with the English phrase "I'm the trigger" as heard on the released track, the video's audio fades out while it climaxes with a shot zooming in to the coffin's supposed glass window and a hand reaches out grabbing the camera. However, the phrase is viewable in the video as it is written in red on the white drumhead of Shinya's  snare drum and as font during J's vocals.

The video for "Rosier" won Best Music Video at the 36th Japan Record Awards.

Track listing
All songs written and composed by Luna Sea.

"Rosier" - 5:25Originally composed by J.
"Rain" - 5:32Originally composed by Inoran.

Covers
"Rosier" was covered by High and Mighty Color on 2007's Luna Sea Memorial Cover Album -Re:birth-, and later included on their album Rock Pit.

It was also covered by defspiral for Crush! 3 - 90's V-Rock Best Hit Cover Love Songs-, which was released on June 27, 2012 and features current visual kei bands covering love songs by visual kei bands of the 90's.

Pop singer Tomomi Kahala recorded a version for her 2014 Memories 2 -Kahara All Time Covers- album.

Female heavy metal band Show-Ya released a version of the song for their 2014 cover album Glamorous Show ~ Japanese Legendary Rock Covers.

Fantôme Iris, a fictional visual kei band from multimedia franchise Argonavis from BanG Dream! covered the song on their first solo live Fantôme Iris 1st LIVE -C'est la vie!-.

References

Luna Sea songs
1994 singles
1994 songs